NFA may refer to:

Governmental
 National Firearms Act, United States
 National Firearms Agreement, Australia
 Net foreign assets, for taxation purposes
 New Fighter Aircraft Project, Canada

Organizations 
 Namibia Football Association
 NFA-Cup, the Namibia Football Association Cup
 National Farmers Association, former name of Irish Farmers' Association
 National Federation of Anglers, now part of the Angling Trust, United Kingdom
 National Fibromyalgia Association, United States
 National Fire Academy, United States
 National Fire Agency, Taiwan
 National Firearms Association, Canada
 National Flute Association, United States
 National Food Authority (Philippines)
 National Football Academy of Lithuania
 National Forensic Association, United States
 National Forestry Authority, Uganda
 National Fostering Agency, United Kingdom
 National Futures Association, United States
 Native Forest Action, New Zealand
 New Farmers of America
 Newburgh Free Academy, United States
 FK NFA, an association football team in Lithuania
 North Flying (IATA airline code: M3, ICAO airline code: NFA) Danish airline, see List of airline codes (N)
 Norwich Free Academy, United States
 Nigeria Football Association
 Nykøbing Falster Alliancen, now Nykøbing FC, Danish football club

Science
 Nondeterministic finite automaton — in computer science
 Non-fullerene acceptor — in polymer chemistry

Other uses 
 N'fa, British-Australian hip hop musician
 Newburgh Free Academy, a public school in Newburgh, New York, US 
 No fire area, a region used in the set-up and construction of a kill box
  No fixed abode, not having a fixed geographical location as a residence
  No Fixed Address (band), Australian rock reggae band

See also

 2NFA
 AFN (disambiguation)
 ANF (disambiguation)
 Fan (disambiguation)
 FNA (disambiguation)
 NAF (disambiguation)
 NFAS (disambiguation)
 NFFA (disambiguation)